Callbeck is a surname; belonging to a number of political figures associated with Prince Edward Island, Canada

List of people with the surname 

 Catherine Callbeck (born 1939), Canadian politician, former Premier of Prince Edward Island
 Henry Callbeck (1818 – January 29, 1898), Canadian politician
 Phillips Callbeck (1744 – January 28, 1790), Irish-Canadian merchant, lawyer and political figure

See also 

 Caldbeck
 Callback (disambiguation)

Surnames of British Isles origin
Surnames of Irish origin